Luzhou is a town under the administration of Huicheng District, Huizhou, Guangdong, China. , it has two residential communities and 19 villages under its administration.

References 

Towns in Guangdong
Huizhou